Silumbur (South) is a village in the Udayarpalayam taluk of Ariyalur district, Tamil Nadu, India.

Demographics 

As per the 2001 census, Silumbur (South) had a total population of 2660 with 1340 males and 1320 females.

References 

Villages in Ariyalur district